James Buchanan (1791–1868) was a U.S. Senator from Pennsylvania from 1834 to 1845. Senator Buchanan may also refer to:

Andrew Buchanan (American politician) (1780–1848), Pennsylvania State Senate
Benjamin Franklin Buchanan (1857–1932), Virginia State Senate
Hugh Buchanan (politician) (1823–1890), Georgia State Senate
John Preston Buchanan (1888–1937), Virginia State Senate